The Honourable Georgina Anne Ward (1941–2010) was a British stage, film and television actress. She was the daughter of the British Cabinet Minister George Ward, 1st Viscount Ward of Witley and Anne Capel (1919-2008), whose father Boy Capel was a muse of fashion designer Coco Chanel.

Antecedents 

Ward’s paternal grandfather William Ward, 2nd Earl of Dudley, whose second wife was the Edwardian music hall star Gertie Millar, was a member of Lord Salisbury’s government and later Governor-General of Australia. His mother, Georgina’s great-grandmother, was the noted Victorian beauty Georgina Moncreiffe, Countess of Dudley, whose sister Harriet’s flirtation with the Prince of Wales, later Edward VII, led to his becoming embroiled in a scandalous divorce case.

On her mother’s side, Ward was the great-granddaughter of the Liberal politician Thomas Lister, Lord Ribblesdale, whose sister-in-law Margot Tennant married H. H. Asquith, British Prime Minister 
at the outbreak of the First World War.

Acting career

Ward studied at the Sorbonne in Paris. Her early acting career was nurtured by Vivien Leigh and she had a number of “walk on” parts with the Royal Shakespeare Company. Among her leading roles on stage was in Strindberg’s Miss Julie in London in 1965. During the 1960s and into the 70s, she appeared in episodes (mostly extant) of a number of popular British TV series, often in nefarious roles, and also in films. Her first movie, in 1963, was the espionage thriller The Man Who Finally Died with Stanley Baker and Peter Cushing. In 1966, at the height of “Swinging London”, Ward’s appearance as Celia Toms, trendy wife of a veterinary surgeon, in Anglia TV’s rural soap opera Weavers Green helped briefly to raise its national profile. As such she was the cover star of the TV Times on 16 July 1966 (during the finals of the FIFA World Cup in England).

Political career forestalled

In the early 70s Ward was a potential Labour candidate for the parliamentary constituency of  Worcester, then held by Conservative Cabinet minister, Peter Walker (and, until 1960, by her father, also a Conservative, who was Secretary of State for Air in Harold Macmillan’s government). However she stood down after risqué photographs of her in the film Clinic Exclusive (also
known as With These Hands) appeared in the press. Ward’s acting career also stalled around this time.

Personal life

In 1958 Ward was one the last debutantes to be presented at Court to Queen Elizabeth II before the practice was discontinued. As part of that year’s social season, her uncle, the Earl of Dudley, gave a dance for her at the Dorchester Hotel. Ward’s first husband, the journalist Alastair Forbes (1918-2005), whom she married in 1966, was uncle
of US Democratic Senator John Kerry. Their marriage was dissolved in 1971. Ward later lived in Mexico
with her second husband, Patrick Tritton (born 1934), an old Etonian and graduate of Trinity College, Cambridge, whom she married in 1978 and who was believed to have been the model for Dicky Umfraville in novelist Anthony Powell’s A Dance to the Music of Time. He died on 1 February 1998.

In July 1961 Ward was convicted at Birmingham Assizes of dangerous driving that caused the death of a roadster after the jury in an earlier hearing had been unable to reach a verdict. She denied that she had been rushing to get to the theatre at Stratford-upon-Avon for a rehearsal, and was fined £100 and disqualified for driving for four years after the judge, Mr Justice Fenton Atkinson, concluded that no “deliberate recklessness was involved”.

Ward was the cousin once removed of actress Rachel Ward. Her only sibling, the Hon Anthony Ward, pre-deceased their father in 1983 and so the Ward viscountcy became extinct on Lord Ward’s death in 1988.

Selected filmography

Television
 Theatre 70, ‘Surrender Value’ (1961)
 Emergency-Ward 10 (1963)
 Suspense, “The Tourelle Skull” (1963)
 The Plane Makers (1964)
 The Third Man (1964)
 Danger Man (2 episodes, 1965)
 The Avengers (1965)
 Gideon's Way (1965)
 The Baron (1966)
 Weavers Green (1966) (as Celia Toms)
 Pride and Prejudice (1967) (as Caroline Bingley)
 The Wednesday Play, ‘Birthday’ (1969)
 The Main Chance (1970)
 Crown Court (1973)
 Life and Soul (Granada TV play) (1973)

In October 1967 Ward was a guest on the BBC2 panel game Call My Bluff.

Film
 The Man Who Finally Died (1963)
 Two Weeks in September (1967)
 Loving Feeling (1968)
 Clinic Exclusive (1972)

References

Bibliography 
 Peter Cowie & Derek Elley. World Filmography: 1967. Fairleigh Dickinson University Press, 1977.

External links 
 

1941 births
2010 deaths
20th-century English actresses
People from Chipping Sodbury
British film actresses
British television actresses
British stage actresses
Daughters of viscounts